WHLE-LP was a low-power FM radio station, licensed in 2003 to the Fellowship of Holy Hip Hop.  While having Atlanta as its city of license, it served only Tyrone, Georgia (and the northern tip of Peachtree City), two of metro Atlanta's suburbs to the south-southwest.

External links
Holy Hip Hop Radio
 

Defunct radio stations in the United States
HLE-LP
HLE-LP
Defunct religious radio stations in the United States
Radio stations established in 2003
2003 establishments in Georgia (U.S. state)
2011 disestablishments in Georgia (U.S. state)
Radio stations disestablished in 2011
HLE-EP